Julia Glushko and Olivia Rogowska were the defending champions, having won the event in 2012, but lost in the first round to Stéphanie Dubois and Stéphanie Foretz Gacon.

Sharon Fichman and Maryna Zanevska won the tournament, defeating Jacqueline Cako and Natalie Pluskota in the final, 6–2, 6–2.

Seeds

Draw

References 
 Draw

Odlum Brown Vancouver Open
Vancouver Open